HLA-A23 (A23) is a human leukocyte antigen serotype within HLA-A serotype group. The serotype is determined by the antibody recognition of α23 subset of HLA-A α-chains. For A23, the alpha, "A", chain are encoded by the HLA-A allele group and the β-chain are encoded by B2M locus. This group currently is dominated by A*2301.  A23 and A are almost synonymous in meaning.
A23 is a split antigen of the broad antigen HLA-A9 and it is a sister serotype of HLA-A24.

A23 is common in Africa and regions of the Middle East, Mediterranean, and India than Europe, East Asia or the Americas.

Serotype

Allele

Haplotypes
A23-B7 is found in N.Afr. and S.Afr non-caucasians. 
A23-B44 is found in Albania, Zimbabwe, Morocco, Spain and Danes.  
A23-B58 is found in the !kung and Zaire.

Associated diseases
A*23:Cw*07 is associated with higher viral load in HIV

References

2